John Lunde Sveinsson (29 January 1922 – 2009) was a Norwegian football player and manager.

During the occupation of Norway by Nazi Germany he fled Norway in 1941. Via neutral Sweden he reached Scotland in 1943 and underwent military training. He also played football for Dundee United during that time. In 1945 he returned as a paratrooper to Norway for the Norwegian Independent Company 1.

Sveinsson mainly played football for SFK Lyn, winning the Norwegian Football Cup 1945 and becoming top goalscorer in the Norwegian Main League 1950-51 with 19 goals. He is also known as Lyn's most prolific goalscorer in one match, with six goals, and also coached Lyn in the 1960s. He was capped three times for Norway, scoring once.

Honours
Individual
Norwegian top division top scorer: 1950–51

References

External links

1922 births
2009 deaths
Norwegian footballers
Lyn Fotball players
Norway international footballers
Norwegian football managers
Lyn Fotball managers
Dundee United F.C. wartime guest players
Norwegian expatriates in Scotland
Norwegian expatriate sportspeople in Sweden
Norwegian Special Operations Executive personnel
Norwegian Army personnel of World War II

Association footballers not categorized by position